Ba Bể is a rural district of Bắc Kạn province in the Northeast region of Vietnam. As of 2019 the district had a population of 48,325. The district covers an area of 678 km². The district town lies at Chợ Rã.

Administrative divisions
The district is divided into one township Chợ Rã, the district town and communes:
Mỹ Phương
Đồng Phúc
Hoàng Trĩ
Quảng Khê
Yến Dương
Chu Hương
Địa Linh
Thượng Giáo
Khang Ninh
Nam Mẫu
Cao Thượng
Cao Trĩ
Phúc Lộc
Bành Trạch
Hà Hiệu

See also
Ba Bể Lake
Ba Bể National Park

References

Districts of Bắc Kạn province